Catuna oberthueri, or Oberthür's pathfinder, is a butterfly in the family Nymphalidae, named after the French entomologist Charles Oberthür. It is found in Sierra Leone, Liberia, Ivory Coast, Ghana, Nigeria, Cameroon, the Republic of the Congo, the Central African Republic, the Democratic Republic of the Congo and western Tanzania. The habitat consists of forests.

References

External links
Seitz, A. Die Gross-Schmetterlinge der Erde 13: Die Afrikanischen Tagfalter. Plate XIII 46

Butterflies described in 1894
Limenitidinae
Butterflies of Africa